Locked In is a 2010 independent thriller drama film directed by Suri Krishnamma and written by Ronnie Christensen, starring Ben Barnes, Sarah Roemer and Eliza Dushku. It was shot in the United States under the working title of Valediction. The film premiered in the United States on September 17, 2010, at the 2010 Boston Film Festival. The film took place in Boston, Massachusetts and South Carolina.

Plot

The story moves through the lives of two fragile yet determined people and maps a private geography of love, loss and ultimate redemption. Josh leaves his advertising career at its peak, when everyone wants either to be him or to have him. Then he walks away from it all: the money, recognition and the life. A car accident leaves his daughter suffering from "locked-in" syndrome. When everyone has given up, she starts communicating with him - or is he going mad?

Cast
Ben Barnes as Josh Sawyer
Sarah Roemer as Emma Sawyer
Blake Lively as Sarah
Nina Dobrev as Jessica
Taylor Momsen as Amy
Eliza Dushku as Renee
Leighton Meester as Rebecca
Paul Wesley as Boston Cop 1
Stephen Amell as Boston Cop 2
James Harvey Ward as Boston Swat 1
Alex Mckenna as Boston Cop 3
Marnette Patterson as Boston Cop 4
Riley Smith as Boston Cop 5
Stuart Townsend as Irish Guy
Spencer Grammer as Tracy
Bug Hall as Boston Cop 6
Melissa Fumero as Swat Cop 1
Marguerite Moreau Boston PD LT Sara
Torrey DeVitto as Boston PD Detective Maria
Annie Wersching as FBI Agent 1
Mekia Cox as Swat Cop 2
Patrick Renna as Bank Armored Car Driver
Erik Von Detten as Detective Billy
Jake Picking as MIT OFFICER Sean
Michaela McManus as FBI Agent Rachel
Courtney Ford as Luna The Killer
Chris Brochu as Officer Joey
David Gallagher as MIT COP 1
Sean Faris as MIT COP 2
Bianca Santos as MIT COP 3
Persia White as MIT COP 4
Malese Jow as MIT COP 5
Will Estes as Boston PD Officer John
Janina Gavankar as Boston Pd Officer Dania Ramirez
Marina Squerciati as Boston PD Officer Danielle
Blake Hood as Boston EMT 1
Maura Tierney as Detective 1
Ana Nogueira as Swat Cop 3
Candice King as Boston EMT 2
David Corenswet as MIT COP 6
Brenda Fricker as Joan
Debra Monk as FBI Agent 2
Eric Lively as Wade
Kat Graham as MIT COP 7
Leelee Sobieski as Detective Carrie
Taissa Farmiga as Nina
Kathryn Erbe as FBI Agent 3
Michael Trevino as MIT COP 8
Taylor Kinney as Boston PD OFFICER 1
Kayla Ewell as Boston PD OFFICER 2
Erin Wilhelmi as Boston PD OFFICER 3
Anthony Molinari as FBI HRT SWAT 1
Marisa Ryan as Boston Cop 7

Reception
At its premiere at BFF, David Chen of /Film gave the film a harshly negative review after walking out thirty minutes in.

References

External links
 

2010 films
2010 thriller drama films
Films directed by Suri Krishnamma
2010 drama films
American thriller drama films
2010s English-language films
2010s American films